The Food Corporation of India (FCI) is a statutory body created and run by the Government of India. It is under the ownership of Ministry of Consumer Affairs, Food and Public Distribution, Government of India formed by the enactment of Food Corporation Act, 1964 by the Parliament of India. Its top official is designated as Chairman and Managing Director who is a central government civil servant of the IAS cadre. It was set up in 1965 with its initial headquarters at Chennai. Later this was moved to New Delhi. It also has regional centers in the capitals of the states.

Mandate 
The Food Corporation of India or the FCI was set up on 14 January 1965 having its first District Office at Thanjavur – rice bowl of Tamil Nadu – and headquarters at Chennai (later shifted to Delhi) under the Food Corporations Act 1964 to implement the National Food Policy's objectives:

Statistics 
It is one of the largest Corporations in India started by the government and probably the largest supply chain management in Asia. It operates through five Zonal offices and 26 Regional offices. Each year, the Food Corporation of India purchases roughly 15 to 20 percent of India's wheat output and 12 to 15 percent of its rice output. The purchases are made from the farmers at the rates declared by the Government of India. This rate is called MSP (Minimum Support Price).

Operations 

There were 21,847 employees working in FCI as of 2019.

The Food Corporation of India procures rice and wheat from farmers through many routes like paddy purchase centres/mill levy/custom milling and stores them in depots. FCI maintains many types of depots like food storage depots and buffer storage complexes and private equity godowns and also implemented latest storage methods of silo storage facilities which are located at Hapur in Uttar Pradesh, Malur in Karnataka and Elavur in Tamil Nadu.

References

Further reading

External links 
 Official Website of FCI

Government-owned companies of India
Companies based in New Delhi
Companies based in Chennai
Food and drink companies of India
Food security
Agricultural marketing in India
Ministry of Consumer Affairs, Food and Public Distribution
Food and drink companies established in 1965
1965 establishments in Madras State